The 2016 Horizon League men's basketball tournament (also known as Motor City Madness) was the conference tournament for the 2015–16 season of the Horizon League. It was played from March 5 through March 8, 2016 at Joe Louis Arena in Detroit. The winner of the tournament received the Horizon League's automatic berth into the 2016 NCAA men's basketball tournament. This was the first Horizon League Tournament since 2002 to be played at a predetermined neutral site.

Seeds
All 10 teams in the conference participated in the tournament. The top two teams received double byes to the semifinals.

For the final time, Northern Kentucky was ineligible for NCAA-operated postseason play during its transition from Division II to Division I. If Northern Kentucky had won the tournament, the loser of the championship game would have received the automatic bid to the NCAA Tournament.

Teams were seeded by record within the conference, with a tiebreaker system to seed teams with identical conference records.

Schedule

Bracket

* - denotes overtime period

References

Tournament
Horizon League men's basketball tournament
Horizon League men's basketball tournament
Horizon League men's basketball tournament
Basketball competitions in Detroit
College sports tournaments in Michigan
2016 in Detroit